Mark Price is an American former basketball player and coach.

Mark Price may also refer to:

Mark Price (musician) (born 1959), English drummer
Mark Price (cricketer) (born 1960), English cricketer
Mark Price, Baron Price (born 1961), British businessman and member of the House of Lords

See also
Marc Price (born 1968), TV actor
Mark de Solla Price (born 1960), author, civil rights activist and HIV/AIDS educator
Mark Price Arena, a multi-purpose arena in Enid, Oklahoma